Kyrylo Petrov (born 22 June 1990) is a Ukrainian professional footballer who plays as a centre-back for Korona Kielce.

Honours

International
Ukraine U19
UEFA European Under-19 Championship: 2009 
Individual
UEFA European Under-19 Championship: 2009

References

External links
 

1990 births
Living people
Footballers from Kyiv
Association football defenders
Ukrainian footballers
Ukraine youth international footballers
Ukraine under-21 international footballers
FC Dynamo Kyiv players
FC Dynamo-2 Kyiv players
FC Kryvbas Kryvyi Rih players
FC Hoverla Uzhhorod players
FC Arsenal Kyiv players
Korona Kielce players
FC Ordabasy players
FC Olimpik Donetsk players
Neftçi PFK players
FC Kolos Kovalivka players
Ukrainian Premier League players
Ekstraklasa players
I liga players
Kazakhstan Premier League players
Azerbaijan Premier League players
Ukrainian expatriate footballers
Ukrainian expatriate sportspeople in Poland
Ukrainian expatriate sportspeople in Kazakhstan
Ukrainian expatriate sportspeople in Azerbaijan
Expatriate footballers in Poland
Expatriate footballers in Kazakhstan
Expatriate footballers in Azerbaijan